Robert Stephen Dehler, C.R., (26 December 1889 – 26 August 1966) was a Canadian Roman Catholic bishop.

Dehler was born in St Agatha, Canada in 1889, and ordained as a Catholic priest in 1916; and served as the Bishop of the Roman Catholic Diocese of Hamilton in Bermuda from 1956 to 1966.

References

1889 births
Bermudian Roman Catholic bishops
20th-century Canadian Roman Catholic priests
1966 deaths
Resurrectionist Congregation
Place of death missing
Canadian expatriates in Bermuda
20th-century Roman Catholic bishops in British Overseas Territories
Roman Catholic bishops of Hamilton in Bermuda